The 129th Duke of Connaught's Own Baluchis was an infantry regiment of the British Indian Army raised in 1846 as the 2nd Bellochee Battalion. It was designated as the 129th Duke of Connaught's Own Baluchis in 1903, and became 4th Battalion (Duke of Connaught's Own) 10th Baluch Regiment in 1922. In 1947, it was allocated to Pakistan Army, where it continues to exist as 11th Battalion of The Baloch Regiment.

Early history
The regiment was raised on 6 May 1846 at Karachi on the orders of General Sir Charles Napier, the British Governor of Sindh. Its manpower was mostly drawn from Balochis, Sindhis and Pathans of Sindh. Later, it also recruited Brahuis and Punjabi Muslims, while the recruitment area was extended to include Baluchistan, North-West Frontier Province and the Punjab. In 1856, the battalion was dispatched to Persia and fought in the Anglo-Persian War. In the post-Mutiny realignment, it was brought into line in 1861 and became the 29th Regiment of Bombay Native Infantry or the 2nd Belooch Regiment. In 1862, the regiment went to China to suppress the Taiping Rebellion. Two years later, they became the first foreign troops to be stationed in Japan, when two companies were sent to Yokohama to guard the British legation. In 1878–80, the 2nd Belooch Regiment fought in the Second Afghan War, followed by the Anglo-Egyptian War of 1882. In 1883, the Duke of Connaught was appointed their Colonel-in-Chief.

Subsequent to the reforms brought about in the British Indian Army by Lord Kitchener in 1903, all former Bombay Army units had 100 added to their numbers. Consequently, the regiment's designation was changed to 129th Duke of Connaught's Own Baluchis. In 1912, General Sir Garrett O'Moore Creagh, VC, GCB, GCSI, Commander-in-Chief, British Indian Army was appointed Colonel of the 129th DCO Baluchis. He was a former Commanding Officer of the regiment. The regimental full dress uniform in 1914 included a rifle green turban and kurta (knee length tunic) piped in red, worn with red trousers and white gaiters. The red trousers were a distinctive feature of all five Baluch infantry regiments then serving in the British Indian Army.
During the First World War, the 129th DCO Baluchis served on the Western Front in France and Belgium, where they became the first Indian regiment to attack the Germans. At Hollebeke, during the First Ypres, Sepoy Khudadad Khan became the first Pakistani to win the Victoria Cross; Britain's highest decoration for valour. The regiment also fought in the Battles of Messines 1914, Armentières 1914, Festubert 1914, Givenchy 1914 and Neuve Chapelle 1915. From France, the regiment proceeded to German East Africa and again distinguished itself in the long and difficult campaign. The German commander, General von Lettow-Vorbeck, said of them: "... the 129th Baluchis ... were without a doubt very good". The regiment suffered a staggering 3585 casualties out of the 4447 officers and men, who served with it in the First World War. Out of these casualties 348 died, including 45 attached men from the 127th Baluchi Light Infantry and 6 men from the 124th Baluchis.
In 1918, the regiment raised a second battalion. Both 1st & 2nd Battalions 129th Duke of Connaught's Own Baluchis fought in the Third Afghan War of 1919, while the 2nd Battalion also served in Iraq during the Iraqi revolt against the British in 1920. The 2nd Battalion was disbanded in 1922.

Subsequent history
In 1922, the regiment was grouped with five other Baluch battalions: 1st & 2nd Battalions of 124th Duchess of Connaught's Own Baluchistan Infantry, 126th Baluchistan Infantry, 127th Queen Mary's Own Baluch Light Infantry and the 130th King George's Own Baluchis (Jacob's Rifles), to form the 10th Baluch Regiment. The 129th Duke of Connaught's Own Baluchis were designated as the 4th Battalion (Duke of Connaught's Own) 10th Baluch Regiment. 
During the Second World War, 4/10th Baluch served in Italian East Africa, North Africa and Italy. The battalion's performance in the war was once again highly commendable. It suffered a total of 1677 casualties and received numerous gallantry awards. On the Partition of India in 1947, the battalion, along with the Baluch Regiment was allocated to Pakistan Army. In the 1948 Indo-Pakistan War, the battalion captured the strategic heights of Pandu in Kashmir. In 1956, on the merger of 8th Punjab and Bahawalpur Regiments with the Baluch Regiment, 4 Baluch was redesignated as 11 Baluch (now 11 Baloch). During the Indo-Pakistani Wars of 1965 and 1971, the battalion fought with distinction in the Lahore and Zafarwal Sectors.

Genealogy
1846	2nd Bellochee Battalion
1858	2nd Belooch Extra Battalion Bombay Native Infantry
1859	2nd Belooch Regiment Bombay Native Infantry
1861	29th Regiment Bombay Native Infantry or 2nd Belooch Regiment
1883	29th (Duke of Connaught's Own) Regiment Bombay Native Infantry or 2nd Belooch Regiment
1885	29th (Duke of Connaught's Own) Regiment Bombay Infantry or 2nd Belooch Regiment
1888	29th (Duke of Connaught's Own) Regiment (2nd Belooch Battalion) Bombay Infantry
1892	29th (Duke of Connaught's Own) Regiment (2nd Baluch Battalion) Bombay Infantry or 29th Baluchis
1901	29th (Duke of Connaught's Own) Baluch Infantry
1903	129th Duke of Connaught's Own Baluchis
1917	1st Battalion 129th Duke of Connaught's Own Baluchis
1922	129th Duke of Connaught's Own Baluchis
1922	4th Battalion (Duke of Connaught's Own) 10th Baluch Regiment or 4/10th Baluch
1945	4th Battalion (Duke of Connaught's Own) The Baluch Regiment or 4 Baluch
1956	11th Battalion The Baluch Regiment or 11 Baluch
1991	11th Battalion The Baloch Regiment or 11 Baloch

Uniforms
Throughout its existence as a separate regiment the 129th Baluchis wore a full dress comprising dark green turban and tunic, the latter with red facings. Trousers were red and cut wide in "knickerbocker" style. Gaiters were white and equipment of brown leather. British officers wore green tunics of rifle regiment pattern with silver ornamented pouch-belts and red trousers. Khaki drill field service uniforms were introduced about 1880 and replaced the green and red for most occasions after 1914.

See also
10th Baluch Regiment
The Baloch Regiment
Sepoy Khudadad Khan, VC

References

Further reading
 Ahmad, Lt Col Rifat Nadeem. (2010). Battle Honours of the Baloch Regiment. Abbottabad: The Baloch Regimental Centre.
 Ahmed, Maj Gen Rafiuddin. (1998). History of the Baloch Regiment 1820-1939. Abbottabad: The Baloch Regimental Centre. 
 Ahmed, Maj Gen Rafiuddin. (2000). History of the Baloch Regiment 1939-1956. Abbottabad: The Baloch Regimental Centre. 
 Barthorp, Michael, & Jeffrey Burn. (1979). Indian Infantry Regiments 1860–1914. Osprey Publishing. 
 Cadell, Sir Patrick. (1938). History of the Bombay Army. London: Longmans & Green
Gaylor, John (1992). Sons of John Company: Indian and Pakistan Armies, 1903-1991, Spellmount Publishers Ltd. .
Qureshi, Lt Col IA. (1966). History of 11th Battalion, the Baluch Regiment. Lahore: The Allied Press.
 Thatcher, WS. (1932). The Fourth Battalion, Duke of Connaught's Own, Tenth Baluch Regiment in the Great War. Cambridge: The University Press. 
 Thatcher, WS. (1980). The Tenth Baluch Regiment in the Second World War. Abbottabad: The Baluch Regimental Centre.

External links
History of the Baloch Regiment 1820–1939 the Colonial Period, text of pages 1 to 15 available online as download preview

Baloch Regiment
British Indian Army infantry regiments
Military units and formations established in 1903
Military units and formations disestablished in 1922